Al Hamra Hehanusa (born 1 July 1999) is an Indonesian professional footballer who plays as a defender for Liga 1 club Persik Kediri. He is the younger brother of Rezaldi Hehanusa.

Club career

Persija Jakarta
Hamra made his first-team debut on 22 June 2019 as a starting in a match against Persela Lamongan at the Surajaya Stadium, Lamongan.

Dewa United (loan)
He signed for Dewa United on 2021 season, on loan from Persija Jakarta. Hamra made his league debut on 23 November 2021 against PSKC Cimahi at the Gelora Bung Karno Madya Stadium, Jakarta.

Persik Kediri
On 13 January 2023, Hamra signed a contract with Liga 1 club Persik Kediri from Persija Jakarta. Hamra made his league debut for the club in a 2–0 win against Madura United on 24 January, coming on as a substituted Krisna Bayu Otto. On 4 March, he scored his first league goal for the club, scored from header in a 2–0 home win against PS Barito Putera at Brawijaya Stadium. Four days later, he scored the opening goal, scoring a header in the 35th minute in a 0–2 away win against Persib Bandung. He also continued his good form in March with scored for the club against his former club, Persija Jakarta, process the same goal through a header. The game ended in a 2–0 victory for Persik Kediri.

Career statistics

Club

Notes

Honours

Club 
Dewa United
 Liga 2 third place (play-offs): 2021

References

External links 
 

1999 births
Living people
Indonesian footballers
Sportspeople from Jakarta
Association football defenders
Persija Jakarta players
Dewa United F.C. players
Liga 1 (Indonesia) players
Liga 2 (Indonesia) players